Iberobaenia is a genus of elateroid beetle. It is the only member of the family Iberobaeniidae. It was first described in 2016, from two species found in Southern Spain. A third species was described in 2017, from the same region. Like some other members of the Elateroidea, the females are neotenic.

Species
Iberobaenia andujari Kundrata et al, 2017
Iberobaenia minuta Bocak et al., 2016
Iberobaenia lencinai Bocak et al., 2016

References

Elateroidea
Elateriformia genera